Julie Lund (born November 2, 1979) is a Danish actress, radio host, and television presenter.

Julie Lund trained at The Arts Educational School, London and TVI Actors Studio, New York City.

Animated movies/Voice Overs – Denmark

 2009 Winx Club - The Movie – Tecna
 2009 Disney's  I Got a Rocket! – Gabby
 2009 Disney's Special Agent Oso – Agent Dotty
 2009 Disney's Hannah Montana: The Movie – Taylor Swift
 2008 Barbie and the Diamond Castle – Alexa
 2008 Disney's Cheetah Girls 3 – Aqua
 2008 H2O: Just Add Water – Rikki
 2008 The Latest Buzz – Rebecca
 2008 Ni Hao, Kai-lan – Mei Mei
 2008 Horseland – Sarah
 2008 Bratz- Kaycee
 2008 The Transformers: The Movie – Arcee
 2008 Dinosapien – Courtney
 2008 Happily N'Ever After – Stepsister/Rapunzel
 2007 Disney's Disney Princess – Aurora
 2007 Disney's Cinderella 3 – Drizella (singing voice)
 2007 Disney's Jump In – Keisha
 2007 Skyland
 2007 Woody Woodpecker – Andy Pandy
 2007 Disney's Peter Pan special edition – Wendy
 2007 Xiaolin Showdown – Ashley/Katnappe
 2007 Lenny & Tweek – Tweek
 2006 Barbie in the 12 Dancing Princesses – Princess Blair
 2006 Disneys The Emperor's New School – Yata/Princess Lalala
 2006 My Gym Partner's a Monkey – Lupe
 2006 The X's – Tuesday
 2006 Bob The Builder – Caroline
 2006 Juniper Lee – Jodi
 2006 Ebb and Flo – Flo
 2005 Renart The Fox – Hermeline
 2005 A.T.O.M – Lioness
 2005 Dragons II: The Metal Ages – Kyra
 2005 Dragons: Fire and Ice – Princess Kyra
 2005 Trollz – Onyx
 2005 Winx Club – Tecna
 2005 Pokémon – Vivian/Mary
 2005 Duel Masters – Flora
 2004 Beyblade – Dr. K
 2004 Martin Mystery – Diana
 2004 Strawberry Shortcake – Honey
 2003 Mary-Kate and Ashley in Action! – Ashley
 2003 Titeuf – Agathe
 2003 Disneys Return to Neverland – Wendy
 2002 Disneys The Hunchback of Notre Dame 2 – Madellaine
 2002 Disneys Hercules: The Animated Series – Cassandra
 2001 Disneys Pepper Ann
 2000 Pokémon: The Movie 2000 – Maren
 1998 Disneys Peter Pan – Wendy
 1997 Disneys Hercules – Groupie
 1996 Animaniacs – Katie Ka-Boom
 1996 Disneys Homeward Bound II: Lost in San Francisco – Hope
 1987 Babar – Flora
 1987 Disneys Oliver & Company – Girl

Theatre
 Polly in Crazy for You, Nyborg Voldspil, 2009
 Svetlana in Chess, Sønderjyllands Symfoniorkester, 2008
 Eponine in Les Misérables, FrederiksborgCentret, 2006
 Marty in Grease, DK Tour, 2005
 Diane de Lys in ''Klokkeren fra Notre Dame, Folketeatret and Det Danske Teater, 2004
 Sirene in Atlantis, Tivolis Koncertsal, 2003
 Frenchy in Grease, Fredericia Teater, 2003
 Kamomilla in Folk og røvere i Kardemomme by, Bellevue Teatret, 2001–2003
 Cecille in Annie, Amager Scenen, 1995–1996
 Louisa in The Sound of Music, Amager Scenen, 1994–1995

Movies
Sorte Kugler (2008)
Familien Gregersen (2004)
Nissernes Ø (2003)

Tv
 Host – Lotto (2008–  )
 Finalist – Elsk mig i nat. (2008)
 Host – Garito (2005–2007)
 Host – Game On (2005–2007)
 Danish Music Awards (2004)

Audio Books
 Kære Dødsbog af Sanne Søndergaard (2008)
 Veninder af Annika Holm (2008)

CD Recordings
 Dansk Melodi Grand Prix – 2007
 Bølle Bob – 1997

External links

Official hjemmeside

Danish actresses
Danish voice actresses
Living people
1979 births
Danish television presenters
Danish women television presenters
Danish radio presenters
Danish women radio presenters